Jama Haji Ahmed is a Somali politician, who is currently serving as the Governor of Maroodi Jeex region of Somaliland since January 2018.

See also

 Governor of Maroodi Jeex
 Maroodi Jeex Region

References

Living people
Governors of Maroodi Jeex
Year of birth missing (living people)